The Central District of Kabudarahang County is a district (bakhsh) in Kabudarahang County, Hamadan Province, Iran. At the 2006 census, its population was 91,257, in 22,084 families.  The District has one city: Kabudarahang.  The District has five rural districts (dehestan): Hajjilu Rural District, Kuhin Rural District, Raheb Rural District, Sabzdasht Rural District, and Sardaran Rural District.

References 

Kabudarahang County
Districts of Hamadan Province